Bhavali Dam, is an earthfill dam on Bham river near Igatpuri, Nashik district in state of Maharashtra in India. Bhavali Dam is located near village Bhavali on Darana river tributary of Godavari river.

Specifications

Purpose
 Irrigation

See also
 Dams in Maharashtra
 List of reservoirs and dams in India

References

Dams in Nashik district
Year of establishment missing